Lubień may refer to the following places in Poland:
Lubień, Lower Silesian Voivodeship (south-west Poland)
Lubień, Łęczyca County in Łódź Voivodeship (central Poland)
Lubień, Piotrków County in Łódź Voivodeship (central Poland)
Lubień, Lesser Poland Voivodeship (south Poland)
Lubień, Lublin Voivodeship (east Poland)
Lubień, Greater Poland Voivodeship (west-central Poland)
Lubień, Lubusz Voivodeship (west Poland)
Lubień, Warmian-Masurian Voivodeship (north Poland)
Wielki Lubień, a village in Świecie County, Kuyavian-Pomeranian Voivodeship (north central Poland)